Chocamine is a brand of cocoa extract found as an ingredient in many consumer health products, such as Nightfood, ChocoMind, ChocoEnergy, LifeMap, Chocoslim, ChocoLift, and ErgoLean AMP. In these consumer products, Chocamine is included to provide the taste, smell and purported health benefits of chocolate, without the sugar, fat, and dairy found in many confectionery products. Cocoa solids contain alkaloids such as theobromine and phenethylamine.  Chocamine contains methylxanthine alkaloids (with a high concentration of theobromine), adrenergic amines, amino acids, and some dietary minerals.

History
Chocolate is reported to be the number one craved food in North America. Recently a lot of research has been conducted to determine any potential health benefits of chocolate. Because of its high degree of consumer appeal, chocolate-based bioactives are regarded as an area of keen interest by the health food industry.

US-based RFI, a company that cites research into the pharmacologically active compounds found in chocolates, acquired Chocamine in 2002, when it merged with nutritional blends company Nat-Trop.

As a chocolate-derived product, Chocamine is classified by the Food and Drug Administration as generally recognized as safe (GRAS).

Use
Chocamine has been available for use in supplements, from beverages, bars, gums, drink mixes, and confections to dietary supplements and powdered drinks. The recommended usage rate is 500 mg per serving by the company.

Varieties
There are two varieties of this product: Chocamine and Chocamine Plus.  The key difference is that Chocamine Plus has caffeine 40 mg per 500 mg serving.  This is approximately the same amount as a 12-ounce can of soda), while "regular" Chocamine is basically "de-caffeinated".

References

Cocoa production